Exerodonta bivocata is a species of frog in the family Hylidae.
It is endemic to Mexico.
Its natural habitats are subtropical or tropical moist montane forests and rivers.
It is threatened by habitat loss.

References

Exerodonta
Amphibians described in 1961
Taxonomy articles created by Polbot